Hearts Grow was a Japanese band from Motobu, Okinawa. Their first single Grow!! was released independently (in limited quantities) on 19 April 2006.  Hearts Grow made their major label debut on 18 October 2006, with the release of their first single Road. Their second single  was released in Japan on 6 December 2006. They are known for performing the ninth opening of Naruto, the fourth ending of Demashita! Powerpuff Girls Z, the fourth opening for Gintama and the first opening of Tetsuwan Birdy: Decode.

As of late 2010 the band has been on an indefinite hiatus. The lead singer Haruna plans on a solo career.

Band members

Discography

Mini-Albums

Singles

References

External links 
 Official Websites:  Ajisai Music 

Sony Music Entertainment Japan artists
Japanese rock music groups
Musical groups disestablished in 2009
Musical groups from Okinawa Prefecture
Anime musical groups